Pomorje, also known (in plural) as the Lands of Pomorje, is a medieval term, used to designate several maritime regions of Upper Dalmatia and its hinterland, that at the end of the 12th century, during the reign of Stefan Nemanja (1166–1196), became part of the Grand Principality of Serbia, and remained part of the medieval Kingdom of Serbia, whose rulers were styled with the title: "crowned king and autocrat of all Serbian and coastal lands". 

The term Pomorje (or Primorje) literally means: coastland (coastal, littoral). Today, regions of medieval Pomorje belong to modern Montenegro, Bosnia and Herzegovina and Croatia.

History
Pomorje included most of the coastal regions of modern-day Montenegro, southern halves of Dalmatia and Herzegovina region.

Medieval Pomorje included most of the coastal regions of modern-day Montenegro, the southern regions of Bosnia and Herzegovina, notably most of Herzegovina region, and a southeastern part of region Dalmatia in Croatia.

Use in royal titles

The term was used in royal and religious titles both by Bosnian and Serbian monarchs and their heirs (Uroš I, styled himself "King in Christ, God faithful, King of Serbia and Maritime Lands", and Patriarchs (Saint Sava III, "Archbishop of All Serbian and Maritime Lands").

 Desa, styled himself "Prince of Pomorje (Maritime Lands)"
 Vladislav, styled himself "King of all the Serbian and Maritime Lands"
 Uroš I, styled himself "King in Christ, God faithful, King of Serbia and Maritime Lands"
 Uroš IV Dušan, "King of all the Serbian and Maritime Lands"
 1329 Stephen II, Ban of Bosnia, styled "high and mighty lord, free ruler and master of Bosnia, Usora and Soli, Donji Kraji and many other places, and Prince of the Hum and the Seaside"
 1377 Tvrtko I crowned himself "King of the Serbs, Bosnia, Maritime, and Western Areas".

See also
 Duklja
 Travunia
 Zahumlje
 Pagania
 Old Serbia

References

Sources
Primary sources

 
 
 
 
 
 
 

Secondary sources

Further reading
 
 

History of Dalmatia
States and territories established in the 9th century
History of Serbia